Jock King (10 April 1925 – 8 September 1982) is a former Scotland international rugby union player. King played as a Hooker.

Rugby union career

Amateur career

King played for Selkirk.

King won the unofficial Scottish championship and the Border League with Selkirk in 1952-53 season.

Provincial career

King represented South.

International career

King was capped for  4 times from 1953 to 1954.

Coaching career

King was to later coach the Selkirk Under 18 side.

References

1925 births
1982 deaths
Scottish rugby union players
Scotland international rugby union players
Rugby union hookers
Selkirk RFC players
South of Scotland District (rugby union) players